Friedrichsfelde is a German locality (Ortsteil) within the borough (Bezirk) of Lichtenberg, Berlin.

History
The locality was first mentioned in a document of 1265 with the name of Rosenfelde. In 1699 it was renamed Friedrichsfelde after the Prince-Elector Frederick III of Brandenburg. It was an autonomous municipality of the former Niederbarnim district until 1920, when it merged into Berlin under the "Greater Berlin Act".

Geography
Located in eastern suburb of Berlin, Friedrichsfelde borders with the localities of Lichtenberg, Rummelsburg, Karlshorst, Marzahn and Biesdorf (both in Marzahn-Hellersdorf district). In its south-eastern corner is situated the "Tierpark Berlin", the second zoo of the city.

Transport
As urban rail, Friedrichsfelde is crossed both by S-Bahn and U-Bahn. The stations serving the locality are Friedrichsfelde Ost (lines S5, S7, S75), Friedrichsfelde (U5), Tierpark (U5) and partly Rummelsburg (S3). The quarter is also served by the tramway lines M17, 27 and 37 and traversed by the federal highways B1 and B5.

Photogallery

References

External links

 Friedrichsfelde page on www.berlin.de
 Friedrichsfelde Event- & Informationportal for all citizens of Friedrichsfelde 

Localities of Berlin